The Barbara Dex Award was a fan-voted accolade awarded annually to the worst-dressed contestant in the Eurovision Song Contest. The award was created by the fansite The House of Eurovision in 1997, which hosted it until the site's closure in 2016. Songfestival.be presented the Barbara Dex Award from 2017 onwards, changing its criterion to the "most striking look" in 2019. Prior to the Eurovision Song Contest 2022, the site announced the award's discontinuation, intending to replace it with a more positively connotated accolade.

History 

The Barbara Dex Award created by Edwin van Thillo and Rob Paardekam, the founders of the Dutch Eurovision fansite The House of Eurovision, in 1997. It was named after Belgian singer Barbara Dex, who represented Belgium in the Eurovision Song Contest 1993 wearing a self-made, semi-transparent dress, which William Lee Adams of Wiwibloggs described her "looking like a lampshade". The Barbara Dex Award was initially awarded to the worst-dressed contestants. Malta's Eurovision Song Contest 1997 entrant, Debbie Scerri, was the first recipient. After two years of deciding the recipient internally, The House of Eurovision opened the award to public voting in 1999.

The House of Eurovision shut down after the Eurovision Song Contest 2016 and handed the Barbara Dex Award to the Belgian website Songfestival.be and its founder, Jasper van Biesen. Van Biesen hoped that this transition would broaden the award's reach. Songfestival.be noted that "this prize for the most striking outfit does not intend to say what is ugly and what is not and does not want to place the Song Contest in a bad light".

On 13 March 2022, Songfestival.be announced that they would be ending the Barbara Dex Award, citing the negative connotation associated with it. Instead, the website would organise a new, replacement award for the "most notable outfit". Following an online vote, Songfestival.be announced on 29 April that the new award would be named the "You're A Vision Award", adding that the new name would serve the purpose of promoting creativity, diversity and positivity in Eurovision on-stage fashion. Australia's Eurovision Song Contest 2022 entrant, Sheldon Riley, was the first recipient of the new award.

Reception 
In a January 2006 interview with ESCToday, Dex stated that there was "nothing wrong" with the Barbara Dex Award. A 2015 poll by Wiwibloggs found Guildo Horn, Germany's 1998 Eurovision act, to be considered the worst-dressed of the previous award recipients.

Award winners

By country

See also 
 List of fashion awards

References

External links 
 

Awards established in 1997
European music awards
Eurovision Song Contest
Fashion awards
Ironic and humorous awards